Gioia Sacco (born 1 February 1988) is an Italian rower, medal winner at senior level at the European Rowing Championships.

References

External links
 

1988 births
Living people
Italian female rowers
Rowers of Fiamme Gialle
Sportspeople from the Province of Latina